ProSieben Maxx is a German free-to-air channel owned by ProSiebenSat.1. The channel started broadcasting on 3 September 2013 with the movie Captain America: The First Avenger at 8:15 p.m. On 30 July 2013 ProSieben Maxx received a DVB-T broadcasting licence for the region of Munich. On 13 August 2013 the channel started a test program on these frequencies and broadcast some program trailers. It is ProSiebenSat.1's sixth channel.

Programming

Prime time 
The channel mainly targets male viewers aged between 30 and 59. Some series like Episodes, Homeland and House of Cards are shown in the original English-language version with German subtitles. No payment is required needed the original versions. ProSieben Maxx also broadcasts some movies, mostly on Thursdays. These movies are repeated a few hours later, not in English but instead dubbed into German.

Daytime 
On 26 June 2013, ProSieben Maxx announced that it would broadcast programmes for kids and teens during the day. Later in the evening, the channel broadcasts programmes for the channel's main target group. The CEO of ProSieben Maxx, René Carl, told the German online magazine DWDL.de, that they would cooperate with m4e Entertainment & Mainstream Media to show anime and cartoon series up to eight to nine hours per day.

Animated series 

Black Clover (2020–present)
Blue Exorcist (2018–2019)
Bobobobs (Die Bobobobs) (2013-2016)
Count Duckula (Graf Duckula) (2013-2014)
Demon Slayer (2021–present)
Detective Conan (2016–present)
Dragon Ball (2014-2015)
Dragon Ball Super (2017–2022)
Dragon Ball Z Kai (2015–2022)
Erased (2018–2019)
Fairy Tail (2018–present)
Family Guy (2013, 2016–present)
Futurama (2013-2014, 2016–present)
Inuyasha (2017–2021)
Jackie Chan Adventures (2013-2015)
Justice League (Die Liga der Gerechten) (2014)
K (2018–2020)
Men In Black: The Series (2013-2016) 
Naruto (2013-2015, 2017–present)
Naruto: Shippuden (2013–2020, 2023–present)
Ned's Newt (Immer Ärger mit Newton) (2013-2014)
Oggy and the Cockroaches (2013–2014)
One Piece (2013–present)
Pat & Mat (2013-2014)
Pokémon (2013–2017)
Shin-Chan (2020)
Star Wars: The Clone Wars (2014)
Storm Hawks (2013-2015)
The Batman (2013)
The Cramp Twins (Die Cramp Twins - Die Zoff Zwillinge) (2013-2014)
The Looney Tunes Show (2013)
The Simpsons (2019–present)
The Three Friends and Jerry (Drei Freunde... und Jerry) (2013-2014)
Yu-Gi-Oh! 5Ds (2014-2018, 2020)
Yu-Gi-Oh! Arc-V (2015-2019)
Yu-Gi-Oh! GX (2013-2016)
Yu-Gi-Oh! Zexal (2014-2017)

Entertainment 

Big Bad BBQ Brawl (BBQ Fight Club) (2018–2020)
Epic Meal Time (Epic Meal Empire) (2017–2018)
Hotel Hell (2016–present)
Man v. Food (2018–2021)
Mission Adventure (2013–present)
Never Ever Do This at Home (2017–2019)
Special Forces: Ultimate Hell Week (Special Forces Bootcamp - Eine Woche in der Trainingshölle) (2016-2017)
Steven liebt Kino! (2013-2015)
What Went Down (World Wide Dummies - Krasse Clips aus dem Netz) (2016–2019)

Series 

Alphas (2015)
Are You There, Chelsea? (2014)
Awake (2014)
Darüber… die Welt (2021)
Chuck (2013-2014)
Episodes (2013)
Eureka (EUReKA - Die geheime Stadt) (2014–2018, 2022–present)
Fringe (Fringe – Grenzfälle des FBI) (2013-2015)
Ghosted (2020, 2022–present)
Ghost Hunters (2021–present)
Hard Knocks (2016–2022)
Helix (2016–2018)
Homeland (2013-2014)
House of Cards (2013-2016)
It's Always Sunny in Philadelphia (2013-2014)
Joko gegen Klaas – Das Duell um die Welt (2013)
Kung Fu (2015, 2017–2018)
Last Man Standing (2013-2014, 2016)
Minority Report (2016)
Northern Exposure (Ausgerechnet Alaska) (2015)
Sanctuary (2013-2015)
Scrubs (Scrubs - Die Anfänger) (2014, 2016–2017)
$#*! My Dad Says (2013, 2016)
Spy (2013)
Stargate Atlantis (2014-2016)
Stargate SG-1 (2013-2016)
Supernatural (2013–present)
Terra Nova (2014-2015, 2017)
The 4400 (4400 – Die Rückkehrer) (2015–2017)
The Flash (2016, 2018–present)
The Last Man on Earth (2017–2019)
The Pacific (2014-2015)
The Shield (The Shield - Gesetz der Gewalt) (2013-2014)
The Strain (2017–2018)
The Unit (The Unit - Eine Frage der Ehre) (2013-2014)
The X-Files (2014–present)
Two and a Half Men (2013–present)
Warehouse 13 (2015-2016, 2018–2022)

Sports 
European League of Football
World Rugby
2019 Rugby World Cup
World Rugby Sevens Series
Licensed from DAZN
Six Nations Championship (from 2020)
NFL (2 Games each Sunday incl. Playoffs and Super Bowl shared with Pro7)
Licensed from Sky Sport
WWE
WWE RAW
WWE SmackDown

Availability 

 DVB-S: Digital via Astra 19,2° (12.545 MHz, transponder: 107, polarisation: horizontal, symbolrate: 22000 MS/s, FEC: 5/6)
 DVB-T: Available in the region around Munich
 DVB-C: e.g. in the networks of Kabel Deutschland, Unitymedia Kabel BW, Tele Columbus, Primacom, NetCologne
 IPTV: Telekom Entertain and Vodafone TV
In the IPTV network, Telekom Entertain, the channel has also been available in HDTV since 20 September 2013. On 15 October 2013 ProSiebenMaxx started HDTV broadcasting in the network of Unitymedia. The CEO René Carl announced, that the intention is to start an HDTV channel on the HD+ platform. The channel is also available on analogue cable TV.

Audience share

Germany

References

External links
 

Television stations in Germany
Television stations in Austria
Television stations in Switzerland
Television channels and stations established in 2013
2013 establishments in Germany
ProSiebenSat.1 Media
Mass media in Munich